Haroonabad Tehsil is a tehsil located in  Bahawalnagar District, Punjab, Pakistan. The city of Haroonabad is the headquarters of the tehsil which is administratively subdivided into 22 Union Councils.

History

Under the Punjab Local Government Act 2013, the Tehsil Municipal Administration for Haroonabad was converted into a Municipal Committee for the city of Haroonabad.

In 2017, the Hindu community of the area was asked to vacate their houses by local administration, allegedly due to pressure from the owners of a housing scheme who intended to demolish these homes. A protest was held in response urging the Punjab government to take action. The Hindu community has lived in the area for about 30 years since the commissioner of Bahawalnagar District allowed them to construct homes on government land in 1987. The Hindu community managed to obtain a stay order from the Punjab government against the notices to vacate their houses.

Geography
Haroonabad Tehsil has an area of 1,295 km2.

Adjacent tehsils
Bahawalnagar Tehsil (northeast)
Raisinghnagar Tehsil, Sri Ganganagar District, Rajasthan, India (northeast)
Anupgarh Tehsil, Sri Ganganagar District, Rajasthan, India (southeast)
Fort Abbas Tehsil (south)
Yazman Tehsil, Bahawalpur District (southwest)
Chishtian Tehsil (northwest)

Demographics

According to the 2017 Census of Pakistan, there are 525,598 people living in Haroonabad Tehsil and 85,626 households. Its population recorded in the 1998 census was 381,767.

References

Bahawalnagar District
Tehsils of Punjab, Pakistan